Acanthocephalus lucii is a species of parasitic worms belonging to the family Echinorhynchidae.

It is native to Europe.

References

Echinorhynchidae